Acacia helmsiana, commonly known as Helm's wattle, is a shrub of the genus Acacia and the subgenus Plurinerves that is endemic to arid areas of central and western Australia.

Description
It tends to branch from ground level and the glabrous, resinous, brown branchlets are slightly angled toward the extremities with minute stipules and grey to reddish-brown coloured bark. Like most species of Acacia it has phyllodes rather than true leaves. It blooms from June to August to November and produces yellow flowers. It has simple inflorescences that occur singly in the axils with spherical flower-heads that contain 20 to 30 light- to mid-golden coloured flowers.

Taxonomy
The species was first formally described by the botanist Joseph Maiden in 1920 as a part of the work Notes on Acacias, No. IV, with descriptions of new species as published in the Journal and Proceedings of the Royal Society of New South Wales. It was reclassified as Racosperma helmsianum by Leslie Pedley in 2003 then returned to genus Acacia in 2006.
The specific epithet honours the explorer and naturalist, Richard Helms (naturalist), who collected the type specimen during the Elder Expedition.

Distribution
It is native to an area in the north west of South Australia, the south western Northern Territory and the Goldfields region of Western Australia where it is commonly situated on sand dunes and sand plains growing in red or yellow sandy soils. The bulk of the population is found from around Wiluna in the west through to Mount Olga in the Northern Territory in the east and is usually a part of open spinifex communities. In South Australia it is restricted to the Serpentine Lakes area.

See also
 List of Acacia species

References

helmsiana
Acacias of Western Australia
Flora of the Northern Territory
Flora of South Australia
Taxa named by Joseph Maiden
Plants described in 1920